The Giants Wrocław (formerly The Crew Wrocław) were an American football team based in Wrocław, Poland. They played in the Polish American Football League.

History
The team was founded in 2005 as Wrocław Angels. In 2007, they won the final of the Polish American Football League against Silesia Miners. In 2008 the team makes his first appearance at the EFAF Cup. In 2009 Aki Jones joined The Crew. Jones is the first former NFL player who is playing in the Polish league. In 2012, the team changed its name from The Crew Wrocław to Giants Wrocław. In 2013, they merged with Devils Wrocław forming a new team Panthers Wrocław.

Season-by-season records

PLFA

EFAF

ČLAF

Honours
 Polish Bowl
 Champions: 2007, 2011, 2013
 Runners-up: 2009, 2010

References

External links 
 

American football teams in Poland
Sport in Wrocław
American football teams established in 2005
American football teams disestablished in 2013
2005 establishments in Poland
2013 disestablishments in Poland